Wilfred Birkett  (26 June 1922 – 24 December 1993) was an English professional footballer who made nearly 200 appearances in the Football League playing as a goalkeeper for Southport and Shrewsbury Town.

Life and career
Birkett was born in Haydock, Lancashire, in 1922. He joined Everton from Haydock Cricket and Bowling Club during the Second World War, but never played for their first team, and moved on to Southport in November 1946. He spent six years at Southport, then lost his place to Ray Minshull and signed for a season with Shrewsbury Town. Returning to Southport in 1953, he regained his first-team place but was forced to retire on medical advice because his right shoulder was prone to dislocation. He remained at the club as assistant trainer for four years, and then spent 12 years as trainer at non-league club Wigan Athletic. He played for them occasionally, notably in the first round proper of the 1962–63 FA Cup against Gateshead; Wigan lost 2–1. Birkett died at his Haydock home in 1993 at the age of 71.

Two brothers, Ronnie and Cliff, were also professional footballers.

References

1922 births
1993 deaths
People from Haydock
English footballers
Association football goalkeepers
Everton F.C. players
Southport F.C. players
Shrewsbury Town F.C. players
Wigan Athletic F.C. players
English Football League players
Southport F.C. non-playing staff
Wigan Athletic F.C. non-playing staff